The Kaladan Road Project is a US$484 million project connecting the eastern Indian seaport of Kolkata with Sittwe seaport in Rakhine State, Myanmar by sea. In Myanmar, it will then link Sittwe seaport to Paletwa in Chin State via the Kaladan river boat route, and then from Paletwa by road to Mizoram state in Northeast India. All components of the project, including Sittwe port and power, river dredging, Paletwa jetty, have been completed, except the under construction Zorinpui-Paletwa road. Originally, the project was scheduled to be completed by 2014, but end-to-end project is expected to be fully operational only by March 2023 as per March 2021 update.

The route of the project around Paletwa and along the Kaladan river is troubled with Chin conflict, Rohingya conflict and militant groups such as Arakan Army and Arakan Rohingya Salvation Army (ARSA). Among these the ARSA, created by Pakistan's Lashkar-e-Toiba and has links with Jamaat-ul-Mujahideen in Bangladesh and the Indian Mujahideen in India, was behind the mass killing of Hindu Burmese Indians in the Kha Maung Seik massacre.

History

Initially India had tried to persuade Bangladesh to offer transport and transit rights to the northeastern states.

The project is being piloted and funded by the Ministry of External Affairs (India). The preliminary feasibility studies were carried out by Rail India Technical and Economic Services (RITES). Construction work on Sittwe port and the boat jetty in Paletwa, as well as the dredging work, will be executed by the Inland Waterways Authority of India (IWAI), with Essar Projects Ltd, a division of the Essar Group appointed in May 2010 as the main contractor.

Kaladan Multi-Modal Transit Transport Project initially faced problems such as underestimation of the road length in Myanmar and plans to construct hydro-electric projects — Chhimtuipui River and Lungleng River — on two tributaries of the Kaladan River followed by another project downstream. That the first two projects are being built by one public sector undertaking and the third is being constructed by another PSU (Public Sector Unit) has also led to coordination issues. Due to construction of this hydro electrical projects, navigation of boats could be effected.

In April 2017, the Sittwe port and IWT Paletwa jetty were ready and operational. In April 2017, India handed over the operation of completed Sittwe port and Inland Water Terminal at Paletwa to Myanmar. In June 2017, India handed six gas tanker cargo vessels worth US$81.29 million (K110.08 billion) to the Myanmar government to transport gas to north-east India via Manipur. Work on the port in Sittwe and the IWT in Paletwa, Chin State, is in its final stages, and the six cargo vessels are meant to facilitate transportation of goods from Sittwe to Paletwa. The $81.29 million cost of the vessels was met through a grant from India. The construction work was assigned to IWT in October 2012, the keels were laid in March 2013 and the vessels were launched between April and December 2016. On completion of the tests and trials at Yangon, the vessels reached Sittwe in March 2017. Acceptance trials were completed in April 2017 in Sittwe.

In June 2017, after several upward budget revisions and troubles in finding contractors, the INR1,600-crore (US$250 million) contract has been finally awarded to an Indian company C&C construction for building 109-km road connecting IWT Paletwa river terminal to Zorinpui in Mizoram border. The contractor would open offices at Sittwe, Paletwa and Yangon in Myanmar, mobilise men and machine during the monsoon and start construction after the monsoon in October.

Route

Sea–river–road route

The project has several sections combining multi-modes of transport:

 Kolkata-Sittwe shipping route -  from seaport of Kolkata in India to Sittwe seaport in Myanmar via Bay of Bengal. This sea route has been operational for several decades. Port upgrade, from 20,000 ton vessels to  40,000 ton capacity vessels, has been completed.

 Sittwe seaport to Paletwa inland jettyriver boat route - ' from Sittwe seaport to Inland Water Terminal (IWT) and hydro power project at Paletwa jetty via Kaladan river in Myanmar. River dredging and jetty upgrade completed in June 2017. There is at least one river lock for navigation. Six barges of 300 ton capacity each were handed over to Myanmar by the government of India. Completed.

 Paletwa inland jetty to Zorinpui road route in Myanmar -  two-lane in each direction (4 lanes total) road route from IWT Paletwa to Zochawchhuah(India)–Zorinpui (Myanmar) at Indo-Myanmar border in Myanmar. Construction contract of INR1600 crore (16 billion) was awarded to Ircon in June 2017, and construction commenced in April 2018, after all the necessary approvals were granted by the Myanmar govt in January 2018. Integrated Customs & Immigration Checkpost at Zochawchhuah-Zorinpui has been operational since 2017. Tender for the road upgrade was awarded in 2017, currently under-construction and to be completed by March 2023 as per March 2021 update.

 Zorinpui to Aizawl road route in India -  from Indo-Myanmar border at Zorinpui to Aizawl. Almost complete (June 2017). Awarded, upgrade to this national highway is under-construction and to be completed by March 2023. as per March 2021 update. In June 2017,  2-lane route from Indo-Myanmar border at Zochawchhuah-Zorinpui to Tuipang is almost complete. From Tuipang, the national highway is being further upgraded from 2-lane to all-weather 4-lane from NH 54 Lawngtlai to Aizawl in Mizoram. INR6000 crore (60 billion) was approved to further improve this Zochawchhuah–Zorinpui–Aizawl national highway. Siaha–Zochawchhuah–Zorinpui missing section of the highway was under construction (April 2018). Lomasu to Lawngtlai is a two-lane highway in each direction (total four lanes) and Lawngtlai to Aizawl–Guwahati national highway is being widened to 4 lanes in each direction (total 8 lanes).

Complementary railway route

This railway route will complement the river–road route of this project in Myanmar-Mizoram:

 Sittwe–Kyaukhtu railway in Myanmar,  – exists and operational: This route has been operational since 2011.

 Kyaukhtu–Zorinpui in Myanmar,  – planned but not yet surveyed: India has future yet-unapproved plans to fund and construct this missing link.

 Zochawchhuah (Zorinpui)–Sairang railway in India,  – being surveyed since Aug-2017: Survey for the rail line from Sairang (Aizawl) to Hmawngbuchhuah on border near Zochawchhuah–Zorinpui was completed in August 2017 and it will be constructed in future phase.

Other projects – alternate route to northeast India
As an alternate route (unrelated to the Kaladan Multi-Modal project) to northeast India, India is also developing railway route from Cox's Bazar deep water port to South Tripura district by rehabilitating the railway link from Santirbazar in India to Feni in Bangladesh, where a road and rail bridge is being built to connect the "Belonia, India–Parshuram, Bangladesh road and rail crossing checkposts", this will reduce traffic through Sittwe, but will provide strategically redundancy if there is a war with China.

Travel arrangements

Zorinpui border crossing and visa arrangements 

Integrated Customs & Immigration Checkpost at Zorinpui in Lawngtlai district, is already operational since 2017. In early 2018, visa agreement were signed for the citizens of two nations to travel by road for education, medical assistance, tourism and other purposes. This agreement was operationalised on 9 August 2018. Indians and Myanma citizens with valid passport and visa can pass through two official Land Border Crossings at Moreh in Manipur (Tamu in Sagaing Region of Myanmar) and Zokhawthar in Mizoram (Rihkhawdar in Chin State of Myanmar).

Motor Vehicle Agreement

In 2015, India proposed a trilateral Motor Vehicle Agreement to facilitate seamless movement of passenger and cargo vehicles among the three countries. In May 2017, during a visit by Thai officials to Manipur, the state's Chief Secretary Oinam Nabakishore declared that the draft of the trilateral agreement had already been prepared. As of May 2018, the signing of Motor vehicle agreement is still pending.

Related projects

Myanmar is key part of India's "Look East" policy and Kaladan project has enabled several other associated projects with ongoing development of growing list of integrated linkages.

Commerce and trade

Sittwe Special Economic Zone

Sittwe Special Economic Zone (Sittwe SEZ) at Ponnagyun town was announced by India's Union Minister of State for External Affairs V K Singh at the India-ASEAN Foreign Ministers meet at Laos in August 2016.

Energy

Thathay Chaung Hydropower Project

Thathay Chaung Hydropower Project(TCHP) is an 1800 megawatt, two dam project being built and financed by India on Chindwin River in Rakhine State of Myanmar, a 1,200 megawatt dam at Thamanthi (Manthi) and 600 megawatt dam at Shwejaye. The electricity produced will be supplied to Manipur state of India.

Sittwe–Gaya gas pipeline

Highways

Agartala–Feni–Chittagong Highway 

Indian has decided to build an INR130 crore (US$20 million) bridge over the Feni River at the Tripura-Bangladesh border to connect the existing NH8 Agartala–Sabroom on Indian side to Chittagong port in Bangladesh  from South Tripura. In February 2017, the project was in tendering stage.

Aizawl–Tuipang National Highway 4-laning 

In June 2017, to ensure faster movement of goods between Sittwe and Mizoram capital of Aizawl in the North West which is close to the Barak Valley of Assam, India started an INR6,000-crore upgrade of current 2-lane  Aizawl–Tuipang national highway to all-weather four-laning of international standard, the tender will be floated in September and construction contract will be awarded by December 2017 after the ongoing land acquisition is complete.

India–Myanmar–Thailand Trilateral Highway

The India–Myanmar–Thailand (IMT) Trilateral Highway (Friendship Highway) is a highway under construction that will connect Moreh, India with Mae Sot, Thailand via Myanmar. The road is expected to boost trade and commerce in the ASEAN–India Free Trade Area, as well as with the rest of Southeast Asia. India has also proposed extending the highway to Cambodia, Laos and Vietnam. The proposed approx  route from India to Vietnam is known as the East-West Economic Corridor (EWEC).

Paletwa–Cikha–India Highway 

On 21 April 2016, Chin State Chief Minister Pu Lian Luai in Myanmar informed that the project is funded by Indian government, which will connect Paletwa in southern Chin state to Cikha (also misspelt as Chikha in Indian media) sub-town in northern Chin state. New roads will also be built to connect the Paletwa-Chikha highway to villages and towns in Chin state.

Zokhawthar–Rihkhawdar–Kalemyo Highway

Railway

Bairabi-Sairang-Hmawngbuchhuah railway

Indian Railways has already converted to broad gauge the current  rail line from Katakhal (Assam) to Bairabi  inside Mizoram. Its further  Bairabi Sairang Railway extension from Bairabi to Sairang ( north of Aizawl) in Mizoram is under construction with target completion date of March 2019 as per status update in March 2016. In August 2015, India railway completed a survey for a possible new route extension from Sairang to Hmawngbuchhuah on Mizoram's southern tip on the border of Myanmar, where at nearby Zochachhuah village the National Highway 502 (part of Kaladan Multi-Modal Transit Transport Project) enters Myanmar, leaving a possibility open for yet-unplanned future rail connections to Paletwa.

See also
 Nearby major port projects 
 Sabang strategic port development, India-Indonesia project
 Dawei Port Project in Myanmar
 India's Look-East Connectivity projects

 Regional projects 
 India's Look-East Connectivity projects
 India's Northeast Connectivity projects 
 BIMSTEC projects
 Mekong-Ganga Cooperation
 India–Myanmar–Thailand Trilateral Highway
 Asian Highway Network
 India–Myanmar barrier

References

External links
 Detailed report on Kaladan Project: Project Description with Analysis of Positive and Negative Impact
 MDoner

Proposed transport infrastructure in India
Proposed transport infrastructure in Myanmar
Buildings and structures in Mizoram
Buildings and structures in Rakhine State
Sittwe
Transport in Mizoram